Harry Arnold may refer to:

 Harry Arnold (musician) (1920–1971), Swedish jazz saxophonist and bandleader
 Harry Arnold (journalist) (1941–2014), British journalist